Lika Salmanyan , is an Armenian actress. She is known for her recurring role as Anoushik on 3D Love and Emka on Own Enemies.

Filmography

References

External links 
 

Living people
Armenian film actresses
21st-century Armenian actresses
1997 births